Van Den Haute or Vandenhaute is a surname. Notable people with the surname include:

Ferdi Van Den Haute (born 1952), Belgian cyclist

Steffy Van Den Haute (born 1993), Belgian cyclist

Wouter Vandenhaute (born 1962), Belgian businessman and journalist

Surnames of Dutch origin